Acid drop or acid drops may refer to:

 Acid Drop (game), an Atari 2600 game
 Acid drop, a skateboard trick credited to Duane Peters
 Acid drop, a candy or sweet coated with sour sanding
 "Acid Drops", a song from the album That What Is Not by Public Image Ltd
 Acid Drops, a book by Kenneth Williams
 Acid Drops, a play by Gertrude E. Jennings
 Leptomeria acida, an Australian parasitic shrub

See also 
 Operation Acid Drop, a World War II operation